Carex nigromarginata is a North American sedge which grows on acid soils in dry woodland, thickets, and roadside, and similar ruderal habitats in partial shade or in full sun, often near streams at elevations of . The plants grow in dense clumps, often forming circular patterns on forest floors or roadsides. 2n = 36.

Range
Ontario, west to Illinois, Missouri, and Arkansas, south from Mississippi to South Carolina and northeast to Rhode Island, Connecticut and Massachusetts.

References

nigromarginata
Plants described in 1824
Flora of the Eastern United States
Flora of Canada